Jaden Casella (born 10 March 2000) is an Australian professional footballer who plays as a winger for Rockdale Ilinden.

References

External links

2000 births
Living people
Australian soccer players
Association football midfielders
Rockdale Ilinden FC players
Central Coast Mariners FC players
National Premier Leagues players
A-League Men players